Deepa Kundur is a professor, researcher at the University of Toronto, Ontario, Canada. She was named Fellow of the Institute of Electrical and Electronics Engineers (IEEE) in 2015 for "contributions to signal processing techniques for multimedia and cybersecurity."  

She is currently serving as Chair of Electrical and Computer Engineering (ECE) department (July 2019- present). During 2017–2019, She has served as Chair of Engineering Science Division in Faculty of Applied Science and Engineering in University of Toronto. 

Dr. Kundur is the daughter of Dr. Prabha Kundur, a prominent personality in the smart grid and power system research.

Education
She has completed B.A.Sc., M.A.Sc., and Ph.D. degrees all in Electrical and Computer Engineering in 1993, 1995, and 1999, respectively, from the University of Toronto.

References

Fellow Members of the IEEE
Living people
University of Toronto alumni
Academic staff of the University of Toronto
Year of birth missing (living people)